The NSG mouse (NOD scid gamma mouse)  is a brand of immunodeficient laboratory mice, developed and marketed by Jackson Laboratory, which carries the strain NOD.Cg-Prkdcscid Il2rgtm1Wjl/SzJ. NSG branded mice are among the most immunodeficient described to date.  NSG branded mice lack mature T cells, B cells, and natural killer (NK) cells.  NSG branded mice are also deficient in multiple cytokine signaling pathways, and they have many defects in innate immunity.  The compound immunodeficiencies in NSG branded mice permit the engraftment of a wide range of primary human cells, and enable sophisticated modeling of many areas of human biology and disease.  NSG branded mice were developed in the laboratory of Dr. Leonard Shultz at Jackson Laboratory, which owns the NSG trade mark.

Features of NSG mice
The genetic background, derived from inbred NOD mouse strain NOD/ShiLtJ, contributes reductions in innate immunity that include an absent hemolytic complement system, reduced dendritic cell function, and defective macrophage activity.  The NOD/ShiLtJ background also contributes an allele of the Sirpa gene that renders the bone marrow niche very permissive to colonization by human hematopoietic stem cells.
The Prkdcscid mutation, commonly known as “scid” or “severe combined immunodeficiency”, essentially eliminates adaptive immunity.  Prkdcscid is a loss-of-function mutation in the mouse homologue of the human PRKDC gene, which encodes a protein that resolves DNA strand breaks that occur during V(D)J recombination in developing T and B lymphocytes.  Mice homozygous for the mutation have severely reduced numbers of mature T and B cells.  The phenotypic penetrance of Prkdcscid varies among inbred strain backgrounds, but the mutation is most effective at eliminating adaptive immunity on the NOD genetic background. Due to the Prkdcscid mutation, however, the NSG strain shows high sensitivity to radiation, T-cell leakage, and increased incidence of thymic lymphoma formation; as such, this strain cannot be used to predict clinical response to certain anticancer drugs, or for long-term transplantation studies. 
The Il2rgtm1Wjl targeted mutation is a complete null mutation in the gene encoding the interleukin 2 receptor gamma chain (IL2Rγ, homologous to IL2RG in humans).  IL2Rγ is a common component of the cell surface receptors that bind and transduce signals from six distinct interleukins.  Signaling through IL2Rγ is required for the differentiation and function of many hematopoietic cells.  Notably, the absence of IL2Rγ blocks NK cell differentiation, and thereby removes a major obstacle preventing the efficient engraftment of primary human cells.

Research applications of NSG include
Primary human lung tumor xenografts that preserve the tumor microenvironment during long-term engraftment 
Humanized model for evaluation of possible cancer curing gene therapy.
Models of acute or chronic leukemia established using cancer cells collected from patients (A complete list of publications is available here)
A highly sensitive platform for studying epithelial  and cancer stem cells
Establishing a functional, humanized immune system from engrafted human hematopoietic stem cells  and progenitors 
Humanized models for studying human-specific infectious diseases like HIV, Epstein Barr virus, malaria, and Dengue fever.  Humanized models also aid in testing new therapies 
Studying allograft rejection after pancreatic islet transplantation therapy for type 1 diabetes

References

Notes
1.Mouse Genome Informatics entry for Prkdcscid
2.Mouse Genome Informatics entry for Il2rgtm1Wjl

External links
NSG strain datasheet at The Jackson Laboratory
NSG discussion forum
Categorized list of references

Immunology mice